The Glasgow and South Western Railway (GSWR) 8 class were a class of sixteen  steam locomotives built between 1868 and 1870. 

The sixteen  examples of this class were designed by James Stirling for the GSWR and were built at Kilmarnock Locomotive Works (Works Nos. 49 and 54-67) between 1868 and 1870. They were numbered irregularly, and not in chronological order between 8 and 183, to fill gaps in the sequence of running numbers. The members of the class were fitted with domeless boilers and a cut away cab. They were fitted with spring balance type safety valves, but this was replaced by those of the Ramsbottom design over the centre of the boiler.

Withdrawal 
The bulk of the class, including all the rebuilds were scrapped between 1900 and 1905 but two survived until 1913 and 1917 respectively.

References 
 

 

008
Standard gauge steam locomotives of Great Britain
Railway locomotives introduced in 1868
Scrapped locomotives
2-4-0 locomotives